Jade Jay Mingi (born 22 October 2000) is an English footballer who plays as a midfielder for Portsmouth.

Career
Mingi came through West Ham United's academy before joining Charlton Athletic on a professional contract in 2019 after being released by West Ham.

He made his debut for Charlton Athletic on 30 September 2020 in a 1–1 EFL Trophy draw with Brighton U21, before scoring his first goal the following match as Charlton defeated Leyton Orient 3–1, again in the EFL Trophy.

On 24 September 2021, Mingi joined Portsmouth having been released by Charlton Athletic. Mingi joined Maidenhead United on a one-month loan on 5 October 2021.

Career statistics

References

External links
 

2000 births
Living people
English footballers
Association football midfielders
West Ham United F.C. players
Charlton Athletic F.C. players
Portsmouth F.C. players
Maidenhead United F.C. players
English Football League players
National League (English football) players
Black British sportspeople